Maroun Khoury Sader, (born on December 25, 1926, Ain Ebel, Lebanon – died on August 26, 2015) was a Maronite Archeparch of the Maronite Catholic Archeparchy of Tyre.

Life

Ordained to the priesthood on May 11, 1952, Khoury Sader was named Archbishop of Tyre, Lebanon, on June 1, 1992 by Pope John Paul II. Maronite Patriarch of Antioch Nasrallah Boutros Sfeir ordained Sader to the episcopate on July 18, 1992 and his co-consecrators were Roland Aboujaoudé, Auxiliary bishop of Antioch, and Joseph Merhi, MLM, Eparch of Cairo. Sader retired on September 25, 2003 of his duties as Archeparch.

Sader died on August 26, 2015 at the age of 88.

Notes

External links
 http://www.gcatholic.org/dioceses/diocese/tyrz1.htm

1926 births
2015 deaths
Lebanese clergy
21st-century Maronite Catholic bishops
20th-century Maronite Catholic bishops